Svirstroy is an urban locality (an urban-type settlement) in Lodeynopolsky District of Leningrad Oblast, Russia, located on the left bank of the Svir River several kilometers northeast of the town of Lodeynoye Pole. Municipally, it is incorporated as Svirstroyskoye Urban Settlement, one of the two urban settlements in the district. The name of the settlement is an abbreviation meaning Construction on the Svir. Population:

History

In 1927, a large-scale construction of the Lower Svir Hydroelectric Station started, and subsequently in 1931, the concentration camp of Svirlag was established. The settlement which hosted the headquarters of Svirlag became known as Svirstroy. In the same year, Svirstroy was granted urban-type settlement status. On May 13, 1963, during the abortive Khrushhyov administrative reform, Svirstroy was subordinated to the town of Podporozhye, but on January 13, 1965 it was transferred back to Lodeynopolsky District.

Economy

The economy of the settlement is essentially based on the Lower Svir Hydroelectric Station.

Transportation
A paved road connecting Lodeynoye Pole with Podporozhye and Vytegra passes Svirstroy.

The Svir River is navigable and is a part of the Volga–Baltic Waterway, connecting the basins of the Volga and the Neva Rivers. There is regular cruise and cargo traffic along the waterway.

References

Notes

Sources

Urban-type settlements in Leningrad Oblast